Kaylia Nemour (born 30 December 2006) is a French-Algerian artistic gymnast currently representing Algeria in international competition.  She is the 2022 Arab Champion on the uneven bars.

Early life 
Kaylia Nemour was born in Saint-Benoît-la-Forêt, France on 30 December 2006 to a French mother and an Algerian father.

Gymnastics career

Junior

2019 
At the French Championships Nemour won the all-around for her age division; additionally she scored the highest on floor exercise and uneven bars and third highest on vault.  In September she competed at the Mediterranean Championships where she helped France finish third as a team.  Individually Nemour placed first in the all-around, on uneven bars, and on balance beam, fourth on vault, and fifth on floor exercise.  Nemour next competed at the Swiss Cup Juniors where she helped France finish second as a team and individually she won silver in the all-around behind Ana Bărbosu.

2020–21 
Most competitions were canceled or postponed in 2020 due to the global COVID-19 pandemic.  Nemour competed at various domestic competitions such as the Top 12 Series 3 in February and an internal test meet in October.  She competed at the Coupe d’Hiver as part of the Blue Team; they finished first as a team.  Additionally Nemour finished first in the all-around.

In 2021 Nemour competed at the French National Championships.  She only competed on the uneven bars but won the title ahead of senior competitor Marine Boyer.  Nemour had to undergo two surgeries on her knees after developing osteochondritis.

Senior

2022 
Nemour became age-eligible for senior competition in 2022.  Although her personal doctor cleared her to resume training, the French national team doctor was unwilling to do so.  As a result, Nemour opted to pursue changing her nationality to represent Algeria.  In July the International Gymnastics Federation approved the nationality change; however, because the French Gymnastics Federation blocked the request, Nemour would not be able to represent Algeria in FIG-sanctioned competitions (such as World Championships or African Championships) until July 2023.

In October Nemour made her debut for Algeria, competing at the Arab Championships.  While there she helped Algeria win gold in the team competition.  Individually she won gold on the uneven bars and silver on balance beam behind Jana Abdelsalam.

Competitive history

References

External links 
 

2006 births
Living people
French female artistic gymnasts
Algerian female artistic gymnasts
21st-century French women
21st-century Algerian women